Commission scolaire Sainte-Croix was a Roman Catholic school district headquartered in the Saint-Laurent borough of Montreal, Quebec, Canada.

It was abolished in 1998. French schools became a part of Commission scolaire Marguerite-Bourgeoys while the English Montreal School Board serves anglophone students.

Schools
Schools were French-language except for two.

Secondary:     
 École secondaire Émile-Legault - Saint-Laurent
 Father McDonald High School (English) - Saint-Laurent
 École secondaire Paul-Gérin-Lajoie - Outremont
 École secondaire Pierre-Laporte - Mont-Royal
 École secondaire Saint-Germain de Saint-Laurent - Saint-Laurent

Primary:
 Académie Saint-Clément
 Aquarelle - Saint-Laurent
 Beau séjour - Saint-Laurent
 Bois-franc - Saint-Laurent
 Cardinal-Léger - Saint-Laurent
 Édouard-Laurin - Saint-Laurent
 Enfant-Soleil - Saint-Laurent
 Hébert - Saint-Laurent
 Henri-Beaulieu - Saint-Laurent
 Holy Cross (English) - Saint-Laurent
 Jonathan - Saint-Laurent
 Lajoie - Outremont
 Morand-Nantel - Saint-Laurent
 Nouvelle Querbes - Outremont
 Saint-Clément - Mont-Royal
 Saint-Germain d'Outremont - Outremont

References

External links
 

Education in Montreal
Saint-Laurent, Quebec
Educational institutions disestablished in 1998
1998 disestablishments in Quebec
Historical school districts in Quebec